Tetratricopeptide repeat protein 35 is a protein that in humans is encoded by the TTC35 gene.

References

Further reading